Delmar Loop is a St. Louis MetroLink station. This station is adjacent to the Delmar Loop entertainment district that straddles St. Louis and St. Louis County and includes 362 park and ride spaces. Nearby attractions include the restored Tivoli Theater as well as the Pageant concert venue along with the numerous restaurants and shops that line Delmar Boulevard. Directly adjacent to the stop is the North Campus of Washington University in St. Louis.

The Loop Trolley system, a heritage streetcar service that travels along Delmar Boulevard and DeBaliviere Avenue to Forest Park, and operates from about April to October, has a stop adjacent to the entrance of the MetroLink station.

History 
The station is located below the Wabash Railroad's Delmar Boulevard station, which closed in 1970.

Arts in Transit 
In 1997, Metro's Arts in Transit program commissioned the work TileLink by Catharine Magel for installation along the pedestrian path between the park and ride lot and the station. TileLink demonstrates how the impact of public art can be a rallying point for the revitalization of neighborhoods and communities. TileLink was the first permanent artwork installation commissioned by Arts in Transit.

In 2003, the Arts in Transit program commissioned another work nearby the station along the Pageant walkway. Titled Vertical Loop and created by Ron Fondaw, the piece is an installation of seven sculptures composed of colorful, three-dimensional, fiberglass objects designed to reflect the dynamic commercial district known as the Delmar Loop.

In 2009, Arts in Transit commissioned another work for the station. Titled Hive and created by Janet Lofquist, the honeycomb structure, made of weathering steel, is a symbol for the collective spirit of the community. Starting as a beehive shape, the hexagonal geometry transitions into a spiral of growth and ends in an abstracted question mark. The weathered steel suggests an industrial past and contrasts with the white cell interiors.

2022 Flooding 
On July 26, 2022, the Delmar Loop and Forest Park-DeBaliviere stations were flooded in a catastrophic flash flooding event that shut the system down for close to 72 hours. Damage to the stations, rolling stock, ballast, signaling infrastructure, fiber optics, etc. is estimated to be $40 million.

On September 5, 2022, Metro announced new schedules to accommodate repairs being made to the system. It is estimated repairs could take six months or longer.

Station layout
The platforms can be accessed via stairs or ramps from Hodiamont Avenue, Des Peres Avenue, and the park and ride lot off of Rosedale Avenue.

References

External links 
 St. Louis Metro

MetroLink stations in St. Louis
Railway stations in the United States opened in 1993
Red Line (St. Louis MetroLink)
Delmar Loop Trolley